Ultra-long-haul (also known as "ultra-long-range operations" ) refers to the duration of a flight (flight duration) being "ultra long." IATA, ICAO, and IFALPA jointly define any flight scheduled to last over 16 hours as "Ultra Long". 

These flights usually follow a great circle route, often passing over a polar region. In some cases, non-stop ultra-long-haul routes could be less preferable to stopover flights as passengers on ultra-long-haul nonstop flights must sit in the aircraft for those long hours. A low-oil-price environment favors the establishment and operation of ultra-long-haul flights. 

Since 9 November 2020, Singapore Airlines SQ 23/24 is the world's longest active commercial flight, between Singapore and New York JFK airport, covering  in around 18 hours and 40 minutes, operated by an Airbus A350-900ULR.

History

Ultra-long-haul flights lasting over 16 hours in duration have been around since the 1930s.  While modern jet aircraft travel at faster speeds and cover longer distances, the record for the longest scheduled commercial ultra-long-haul flight route remains set in 1943.  Some of the historical ultra-long-haul routes include:

 October 21, 1936 the first scheduled commercial transpacific flight was operated by Pan American Airways on a Martin M-130 Flying Boat with 7 paying passengers on board.  Flying from San Francisco to Pearl Harbor, Hawaii non-stop, a distance of 3,871 kilometres (2,405 mi; 2,090 nmi) in 19 hours, 36 minutes.
 From 1943 to 1945, Qantas operated "The Double Sunrise", a weekly  flight between Perth, Australia and Ceylon (now Sri Lanka), with average flight times of 28 (maximum of 33) hours using a Consolidated PBY Catalina.
 October 1–2, 1957, a Trans World Airlines Lockheed L-1649 Starliner, the ultimate piston-engine airliner in terms of range and endurance, flew the inaugural  London–San Francisco polar route in 23 hours, 19 minutes.
 February 1963, Aeroflot started a Moscow-Havana flight via Murmansk with its Tu-114D. It was around 16 hours from Havana to Murmansk, the longest for a scheduled turboprop flight.
 1 March 2001, following the dissolution of the Soviet Union, the airspace over Russia was opened for overflight purposes, allowing new circumpolar routes to come into use for commercial airlines.Continental Airlines launched a  nonstop service from Newark to Hong Kong with a flying duration exceeding 16 hours.  A few days later, United Airlines started its own JFK–Hong Kong service, adding 10 kilometers to the distance.
 3 February 2004, Singapore Airlines introduced a  flight from Singapore to Los Angeles, scheduled for 16 hours, 30 minutes in the summer, 15 hours, 35 minutes in the winter. It took 17 hours, 20 minutes in summer and 18 hours, 5 minutes in winter on the return trip.
 28 June 2004, Singapore Airlines introduced Flight SQ 21, using the Airbus A340-500 (now an Airbus A350-900 ULR since October 2018) on a  great circle route from Newark to Singapore, passing within  of the North Pole, taking a little over 18 hours. This was immediately surpassed by return Flight SQ 22, which flew a new record of  back to Newark.  Despite the greater distance, Flight SQ 22 averaged a slightly shorter 17 hours, 45 minutes because of prevailing high-altitude winds.

In the late 2000s/early 2010s, rapidly rising fuel prices, coupled with an economic crisis, resulted in cancellation of many ultra-long-haul non-stop flights. This included the services provided by Singapore Airlines from Singapore to Newark and Los Angeles that were ended in late 2013  as well as similar lengthy flights from New York to both Mumbai and Bangkok. As fuel prices later decreased and more fuel efficient aircraft were introduced to the market, the economics of ultra-long-haul flights improved and more distant markets became served by new and reinstated services.  By 2023, 29 of the 30 longest flights in the world (by great circle distance), were now all ultra-long-haul in duration ranging from 16 hours to 18 hours and 50 minutes in duration.

 In 2016 and 2017, ultra-long-haul flights were launched from Dubai and Doha to Auckland respectively.  Both routes became the longest duration active flights at the time of their launch.

 October 18, 2018, Singapore Airlines relaunched Flight SQ 21/22 using the fuel efficient Airbus A350-900ULR with a scheduled flight duration of 18 hours 45 minutes.  It remained the world's longest scheduled ultra-long-haul commercial flight until its suspension on March 24, 2020 due to the global drop in demand due to the COVID-19 pandemic.
 In March 2020, due to the COVID-19 pandemic and the impossibility of transit in the USA through Los Angeles International Airport, Air Tahiti Nui scheduled and operated Flight TN64 in March and April 2020 as a non-stop flight between Papeete and Paris Charles de Gaulle, using a Boeing 787-9 and covering 15,715 km (8,485 nmi; 9,765 mi) in a scheduled duration of 16 hours 20 minutes., setting a new record for the world's longest scheduled commercial passenger flight.
 On November 9, 2020, Singapore Airlines launched the current world's longest ultra-long-haul commercial flight of SQ 23/24 between Singapore and New York JFK airport, with a scheduled duration of 18 hours 40 minutes to cover the great circle distance of 15,349 kilometres (8,288 nmi; 9,537 mi) using an Airbus A350-900ULR.

Airliners

The A380 is capable of flying  with 544 passengers.

The longest range Boeing airliner in service is the 777-200LR, which can cover  with 317 passengers. The Boeing 777-8X is capable of flying  with 350 to 375 passengers. The Boeing 787-9 is capable of flying  with 290 passengers. Longer ranges are possible when not carrying passengers.

New airliners like the A330neo, A350 and B787 enable economically sustainable nonstop ultra-long-haul operations on thinner routes with fewer demands, because all the previous planes capable of providing nonstop ultra-long-haul services are larger and thus more expensive to operate compared to these planes, which in turn require more tickets to be sold and more demands between both destinations to maintain the profitability of those services.

Envisioned ultra long-haul flights

See also 

Flight length
Flight duration
Longest flights
ETOPS/LROPS
International flight

References

External links 
Understanding Travelspeak

Civil aviation